The Brú na Bóinne Visitor Centre ('Valley of the Boyne' often, though incorrectly, rendered 'Palace of the Boyne') is the starting point for all visits to the monuments of the UNESCO World Heritage Site at Brú na Bóinne, notably the passage graves of Newgrange and Knowth. It is located eight kilometers west of Drogheda in County Meath, Ireland.

Background
The Visitor Centre is located near the village of Donore, County Meath, south of the river Boyne, whereas the monuments themselves are located on the north side of the river.

All access to the passage graves is by guided tour only and all tours begin at the visitor centre. Visitors are placed on the next available tour. Due to the small nature of the interior of the monuments, places are limited to around 700 per day at high season, which can fill up quickly - particularly during summer months. Visitors cross the river via a footbridge and are brought by shuttle bus to the monuments.

The Visitor Centre is open all year round, with longer opening hours in the summer time. The Visitor Centre houses a large interactive exhibition on the Brú na Bóinne area, an audio-visual presentation, a wheelchair accessible replica of the interior of the passage and chamber at Newgrange. It also has a tourist office, gift shop and tea rooms. There is a large car park and a picnic area at the Visitor Centre.

A bus service runs from Drogheda to the Visitor Centre via Donore village.  The bus service varies depending on the season.

Access to the other monuments in the Brú na Bóinne complex is also limited. Many of the satellite tombs are on private land, and therefore access is extremely restricted and requires permission from the landowners. The monuments themselves are protected by the Office of Public Works.

Location
The visitor centre is located on the south side of the River Boyne, and the historical site of Newgrange is on the north side of the river and is directly accessed by a footbridge leading from the Centre. The Centre is 8.4 km west of Drogheda and 1 km from the village of Donore.

External links 

Official website
County Meath tourism website

Buildings and structures in County Meath
Museums in County Meath
Archaeological museums in the Republic of Ireland